There were independent and non-affiliated candidates in the 1998 Quebec provincial election, none of whom were elected. Information about these candidates may be found on this page.

Candidates

Mercier: Ann Farrell
Ann Farrell was a Humanist Party of Quebec candidate in two elections during the 1980s. She later tried to re-establish the Humanist Party in Montreal, in a bid to run three candidates at the federal level in the 1997 Canadian election. Farrell may have been an unofficial Humanist Party candidate in 1998.

Richelieu: Michel Groleau
Michel Groleau appeared on the ballot as a non-affiliated candidate. He received 261 votes (0.83%), finishing fourth against Parti Québécois incumbent Sylvain Simard.

References

1998